Cerebellar abiotrophy (CA),  also called cerebellar cortical abiotrophy (CCA), is a genetic neurological disease in animals, best known to affect certain breeds of horses, dogs and cats. It can also develop in humans. It develops when the neurons known as Purkinje cells, located in the cerebellum of the brain, begin to die off.  These cells affect balance and coordination. They have a critical role to play in the brain.  The Purkinje layer allows communication between the granular and molecular cortical layers in the cerebellum. Put simply, without Purkinje cells, an animal loses its sense of space and distance, making balance and coordination difficult.  People with damage to the cerebellum can experience symptoms like unsteady gait, poor muscle control, and trouble speaking or swallowing.

Abiotrophy means the loss of a vital nutritive factor.  The cause of cerebellar abiotrophy is not known, but it is thought to be due to an intrinsic metabolic defect.

In most cases, the Purkinje neurons begin to die off shortly after the animal is born and the condition is noticeable when the animal is less than six months old, though sometimes the onset of symptoms is gradual and the animal is much older before the owner or caretaker notices a problem.

Cerebellar abiotrophy cannot be prevented, other than by selective breeding to avoid the gene, and it cannot be cured.  Genetic testing can detect carriers.  In addition to dogs and horses, there also have been cases of cerebellar abiotrophy in Siamese and Domestic shorthair cats; in Angus, Polled Hereford, Charolais and Holstein Friesian cattle; Merino and Wiltshire sheep; and Yorkshire pigs.

Terminology

The condition in Kerry Blue Terriers is sometimes called progressive neuronal abiotrophy.  Other terms used to describe the condition in dogs include cerebellar cortical atrophy and postnatal cerebellar cortical degeneration.

Cerebellar abiotrophy in horses was originally thought to be a form of cerebellar hypoplasia (CH) and was described as such in older research literature.  However, it was discovered that in horses, the die-off of purkinje cells began after the animal was born, rather than occurring in utero.  Cerebellar hypoplasia is distinctly different in that it is a condition from a lack of these cells being formed during the development of the cerebellum. CH has been found in several species, including cats, dogs, cows and sheep.

There are other diseases that lead to cerebellar degeneration, but the loss of Purkinje cells is a clear way to diagnose cerebellar abiotrophy, and the combination of clinical signs is sufficiently unique that cerebellar abiotrophy can easily be distinguished from other conditions, even in a living animal.

Clinical Signs
Symptoms of cerebellar abiotrophy include ataxia or lack of balance, an awkward wide-legged stance, a head tremor (intention tremor) (in dogs, body tremors also occur), hyperreactivity, lack of menace reflex, stiff or high-stepping gait, coarse or jerky head bob when in motion (or, in very young animals, when attempting to nurse), apparent lack of awareness of where the feet are (sometimes standing or trying to walk with a foot knuckled over), poor depth perception, and a general inability to determine space and distance. The symptoms, when taken as a group, are distinctive and not easily mimicked by other illnesses, though certain types of neurological injury and infection need to be ruled out. Verifying the diagnosis in a laboratory setting is possible only by examining the brain post-mortem to determine if there has been a loss of Purkinje cells.

Most affected animals have normal intelligence and mildly affected animals can, in theory, live out a normal lifespan. However, affected animals are quite accident-prone, and for this reason many animals that develop cerebellar abiotrophy, particularly horses, are euthanized for humane reasons.  Horses may experience difficulty stepping up and over objects, run into fences, fall easily, and even if allowed to mature to full growth, are generally considered unsafe to ride. Dogs may need lifetime assistance with tasks such as climbing stairs.

In horses, the symptoms may worsen from the time of onset for six to 12 months, but if not severe enough to mandate euthanasia, they stabilize over time. In some dog breeds, symptoms appear to progressively worsen, but research is not consistent on this point.  There also is some evidence that affected animals partially compensate for the condition by cognitively learning alternative methods for moving or to determine distance, and thus appear to improve because they become less accident-prone.

Horses
Cerebellar abiotrophy is best known as a condition affecting Arabian horses.  It has also been observed in the Welsh pony and cob, the Australian pony, Curly horse, Miniature horse, the Gotland Pony, one Eriskay Pony, and possibly the Oldenburg.  Most foals appear normal at birth, with symptoms noticeable at an average age of four months, though there have been cases where the condition is first seen shortly after birth and other cases where symptoms are first recognized in horses over one year of age.

Breeds DNA tested that reveal some carrier lines, but to date no affected animals, include the Welsh pony and the Trakehner. However, other breeds heavily influenced by Arabian breeding, such as the Thoroughbred and the American Saddlebred, do not appear to carry the mutation.

In horses, cerebellar abiotrophy is believed to be linked to an autosomal recessive gene.  This means it is not sex-linked, and the allele has to be carried and passed on by both parents in order for an affected animal to be born. Horses that only carry one copy of the gene may pass it on to their offspring, but themselves are perfectly healthy—without symptoms of the disease.  Because it is recessive, the allele for cerebellar abiotrophy may pass through multiple generations before it is expressed.

Cerebellar abiotrophy is sometimes misdiagnosed.  Though the symptoms are quite distinguishable from other neurological conditions, it has been confused with Wobbler's syndrome, equine protozoal myeloencephalitis, and injury-related problems such as a concussion.

A DNA test which identifies markers associated with cerebellar abiotrophy became available in 2008.  The test was refined to identify the most likely mutations, and retesting of earlier samples based on an earlier indirect marker test developed by UCD, indicated a 97% accuracy rate for the old test relative to the newer version, with no false negatives. The causative mutation was identified on the gene TOE1 in 2011.  Research on cerebellar abiotrophy and the DNA test was led by the Veterinary Genetics Laboratory at the UC Davis School of Veterinary Medicine. Researchers working on this problem include Drs. Cecilia Penedo and Leah Brault.  Dr. Ann T. Bowling made significant early contributions to the genetics research on cerebellar abiotrophy.

Dogs
Cerebellar abiotrophy has been seen in the Australian Kelpie, Gordon Setter, Border Collie, Labrador Retriever, Airedale Terrier, English Pointer, Scottish Terrier, Kerry Blue Terrier, Miniature Schnauzer, Lagotto Romagnolo, and other dog breeds.  Time of onset varies. In a few breeds, such as the Beagle, Rough Collie, and Miniature Poodle, Purkinje cells begin to die off at or shortly before birth, and pups are born with symptoms or develop symptoms by three to four weeks of age.  Most breeds prone to the condition, such as the Kerry Blue Terrier, Border Collie, Australian Kelpie, and Labrador Retriever, begin showing symptoms between six and sixteen weeks of age. In a very few breeds, such as the American Staffordshire Terrier, Old English Sheepdog, Brittany Spaniel, and Gordon Setter, symptoms do not appear until adulthood or even middle age.

In dogs, cerebellar abiotrophy is also usually an autosomal recessive gene, but in a few breeds, such as the English Pointer, the gene is sex-linked.

Footnotes

Bibliography

Cerebellar abiotrophy in horses

"Genetic Diseases." Arabian Horse Association

"Cerebellar Abiotrophy,"  Fact sheet, UC Davis Veterinary Genetics Laboratory. 

Goodwin-Campiglio, Lisa.  "Cerebellar Abiotrophy." ''F.O.A.L., accessed November 6, 2011.

Johnson, Robert S. "Test Allows Arabian Breeders to Scan for Inherited Neurologic Disorder" The Horse online edition, September 23 2008, Article # 12746.  Accessed September 23, 2008

Penedo, M. Cecilia T. and Leah Brault.  "Progress Toward Identifying the Gene Responsible for Equine Cerebellar Abiotrophy (CA)." Genetics,  Research Review, 2006, Center for Equine Health, University of California, Davis.  Accessed November 6, 2011

Sponseller, Brett A. A Pedigree Analysis of Cerebellar Cortical Abiotrophy in the Arabian Horse. (Fourth-year seminar paper). Ithaca, NY:  College of Veterinary Medicine, Cornell University, 1994.

WAHO. "Genetic Disorders in Arabian Horses: Current Research Projects."  World Arabian Horse Association, accessed online October 23, 2007

Cerebellar abiotrophy in dogs
General information on genetics, breeding strategies, disease control and diversity.  Mostly articles on dogs, but relevant to other species

Cerebellar abiotrophy in cats

External links to information on cerebellar abiotrophy in horses
A composite site for information on cerebellar abiotrophy with its status list of disclosed horses
Information from the University of California-Davis on cerebellar abiotrophy in horses 
 F.O.A.L., an organization dedicated to fighting lethal genetic conditions in Arabian horses
The Dr. Van Haeringen Laboratorium bv, The Netherlands for cerebellar abiotrophy testing in Europe. English and Dutch.

Video clips of equine cerebellar abiotrophy cases

Video clip of feline cerebellar abiotrophy cases

Arabian and part-Arabian horses
Domesticated animal genetics
Genetic diseases and disorders
Horse diseases